Nikiforovsky (masculine), Nikiforovskaya (feminine), or Nikiforovskoye (neuter) may refer to:
Nikiforovsky District, a district of Tambov Oblast, Russia
Nikiforovsky (inhabited locality) (Nikiforovskaya, Nikiforovskoye), several rural localities in Russia